This is a list of 204 species in Eubulus, a genus of hidden snout weevils in the family Curculionidae.

Eubulus species

 Eubulus acuminatus Fiedler, 1954 c
 Eubulus albicollis Fiedler, 1954 c
 Eubulus albifrons Fiedler, 1939 c
 Eubulus albocucullatus Fiedler, 1952 c
 Eubulus albopectus Fiedler, 1954 c
 Eubulus albopictus Fiedler, 1939 c
 Eubulus albovittatus Fiedler, 1954 c
 Eubulus alticarinatus Champion, 1905 c
 Eubulus altifrons Fiedler, 1939 c
 Eubulus amazonus Fiedler, 1954 c
 Eubulus angularis Champion, 1905 c
 Eubulus annulatus Fiedler, 1939 c
 Eubulus annulifer Champion, 1905 c
 Eubulus aspericollis Kirsch, 1869 c
 Eubulus atricollis Champion, 1905 c
 Eubulus atrodiscus Champion, 1905 c
 Eubulus basirubescens Fiedler, 1952 c
 Eubulus biangularis Champion, 1905 c
 Eubulus bicolor Fiedler, 1939 c
 Eubulus bicuspis Champion, 1905 c
 Eubulus bidentatus Champion, 1905 c
 Eubulus bifasciculatus Champion, 1905 c
 Eubulus bihamatus Champion, 1905 c
 Eubulus biplagiatus Champion, 1905 c
 Eubulus bisignatifrons Papp, 1979 c
 Eubulus bisignatus (Say, 1831) i c g b
 Eubulus boliviensis Hustache, 1924 c
 Eubulus brevifasciatus Fiedler, 1954 c
 Eubulus brevis Champion, 1905 c
 Eubulus bruchi Hustache, 1926 c
 Eubulus camelus Champion, 1905 c
 Eubulus campestris Champion, 1905 c
 Eubulus canaliculatus Fiedler, 1939 c
 Eubulus carinifrons Champion, 1905 c
 Eubulus cerviniventris Fiedler, 1939 c
 Eubulus cervinopunctatus Fiedler, 1954 c
 Eubulus cinctellus Kirsch, 1869 c
 Eubulus circumductus Champion, 1905 c
 Eubulus circumlitus Champion, 1905 c
 Eubulus clavatopilosus Fiedler, 1952 c
 Eubulus clavatus Fiedler, 1939 c
 Eubulus coecus Champion, 1905 c
 Eubulus confusus Wibmer & O'Brien, 1986 c
 Eubulus consanguineus Champion, 1905 c
 Eubulus convexipennis Fiedler, 1939 c
 Eubulus coronatus Fiedler, 1939 c
 Eubulus costatus Champion, 1905 c
 Eubulus costicollis Voss, 1947 c
 Eubulus crassisetis Fiedler, 1939 c
 Eubulus crinitus Champion, 1905 c
 Eubulus crispus Champion, 1905 c
 Eubulus cristula Champion, 1910 c
 Eubulus curvifasciatus Champion, 1905 c
 Eubulus deceptor Champion, 1905 c
 Eubulus densus Champion, 1905 c
 Eubulus diadematus Fiedler, 1954 c
 Eubulus diaspis Champion, 1905 c
 Eubulus discoideus Champion, 1905 c
 Eubulus dissecatus Fiedler, 1939 c
 Eubulus diversipes Fiedler, 1939 c
 Eubulus dumicola Champion, 1905 c
 Eubulus ectypus Fiedler, 1952 c
 Eubulus elongatus Hustache, 1924 c
 Eubulus extensus Fiedler, 1954 c
 Eubulus extraneus Fiedler, 1952 c
 Eubulus fasciculaticollis Fiedler, 1954 c
 Eubulus figuratus Voss, 1954 c
 Eubulus filicornis Fiedler, 1939 c
 Eubulus flavosparsus Fiedler, 1939 c
 Eubulus flavovariegatus Champion, 1905 c
 Eubulus foveirostris Fiedler, 1939 c
 Eubulus fraternus Fiedler, 1939 c
 Eubulus fulvescens Fiedler, 1939 c
 Eubulus fulvicolor Fiedler, 1939 c
 Eubulus fulvipes Fiedler, 1954 c
 Eubulus fulvisquamis Champion, 1905 c
 Eubulus fulvodiscus Champion, 1905 c
 Eubulus fulvopallidus Fiedler, 1939 c
 Eubulus fulvus Fiedler, 1939 c
 Eubulus gibbicollis Fiedler, 1954 c
 Eubulus gonocnemis Fiedler, 1954 c
 Eubulus gracilicornis Champion, 1905 c
 Eubulus granipennis Fiedler, 1939 c
 Eubulus granulatus Fiedler, 1939 c
 Eubulus haenschi Fiedler, 1954 c
 Eubulus hirsutus Fiedler, 1939 c
 Eubulus hirtus Fiedler, 1939 c
 Eubulus hospes Champion, 1905 c
 Eubulus hustachei Fiedler, 1954 c
 Eubulus ignifer Champion, 1905 c
 Eubulus imbricatus Fiedler, 1939 c
 Eubulus immarginatus Champion, 1905 c
 Eubulus impar Fiedler, 1939 c
 Eubulus inaequalis Champion, 1905 c
 Eubulus incrassatus Fiedler, 1939 c
 Eubulus incretus Fiedler, 1939 c
 Eubulus integer Champion, 1905 c
 Eubulus irrubescens Champion, 1905 c
 Eubulus lamellatus Champion, 1905 c
 Eubulus latefasciatus Fiedler, 1954 c
 Eubulus lateralis Fiedler, 1939 c
 Eubulus latevittatus Fiedler, 1954 c
 Eubulus laticollis Champion, 1905 c
 Eubulus leucopleura Champion, 1905 c
 Eubulus lineatipleura Champion, 1905 c
 Eubulus lineatulus Champion, 1905 c
 Eubulus longipes Champion, 1905 c
 Eubulus longisetis Champion, 1905 c
 Eubulus lugubris Fiedler, 1939 c
 Eubulus lunatus Hustache, 1932 c
 Eubulus maculicollis Fiedler, 1939 c
 Eubulus maculifrons Champion, 1905 c
 Eubulus marcidus Champion, 1905 c
 Eubulus marginatus Champion, 1905 c
 Eubulus melanodiscus Champion, 1905 c
 Eubulus melanotus Champion, 1905 c
 Eubulus melanurus Fiedler, 1939 g
 Eubulus miniatus Kuschel, 1950 c
 Eubulus misellus Champion, 1905 c
 Eubulus miser Champion, 1905 c
 Eubulus modestus Fiedler, 1954 c
 Eubulus moerens Champion, 1905 c
 Eubulus moestus Fiedler, 1939 c
 Eubulus monachus Hustache, 1936 c
 Eubulus multicostatus Fiedler, 1939 c
 Eubulus multisignatus Fiedler, 1939 g
 Eubulus munitus Kirsch, 1869 c
 Eubulus mutatus Champion, 1905 c
 Eubulus nigricollis Champion, 1905 c
 Eubulus nigrinus Fiedler, 1954 c
 Eubulus nigrocordatus Fiedler, 1939 c
 Eubulus nigrodiscus Champion, 1905 c
 Eubulus nigronotatus Hustache, 1924 c
 Eubulus nigroplagiatus Fiedler, 1954 c
 Eubulus nigrosignatus Champion, 1905 c
 Eubulus nimbatus Champion, 1905 c
 Eubulus niveipictus Hustache, 1940 c
 Eubulus niveopictus Fiedler, 1939 c
 Eubulus nodulosus Fiedler, 1939 c
 Eubulus notaticollis Fiedler, 1939 c
 Eubulus obliquefasciatus  b
 Eubulus ocellatus Champion, 1905 c
 Eubulus olivaceus Fiedler, 1939 c
 Eubulus opacus Fiedler, 1939 c
 Eubulus orthomasticus Kirsch, 1869 c
 Eubulus ovalis Fiedler, 1939 c
 Eubulus ovatellus Fiedler, 1954 c
 Eubulus paranaensis Fiedler, 1954 c
 Eubulus parilis Fiedler, 1954 c
 Eubulus parochus (Herbst, 1797) i c g b
 Eubulus perforatus Fiedler, 1939 c
 Eubulus persimilis Fiedler, 1939 c
 Eubulus pilipectus Champion, 1905 c
 Eubulus piluliformis Fiedler, 1954 c
 Eubulus plagiatus Fiedler, 1939 c
 Eubulus planifrons Fiedler, 1939 c
 Eubulus pleurostigma Champion, 1905 c
 Eubulus praestabilis Fiedler, 1954 c
 Eubulus protensus Fiedler, 1939 c
 Eubulus pulchellus Champion, 1905 c
 Eubulus punctifrons Champion, 1905 c
 Eubulus pygmaeus Fiedler, 1954 c
 Eubulus quadricollis Champion, 1905 c
 Eubulus quatuordecimcostatus Fiedler, 1939 c
 Eubulus reticollis Fiedler, 1954 c
 Eubulus reticulatus Champion, 1905 c
 Eubulus rhomboidalis Fiedler, 1939 c
 Eubulus romani Fiedler, 1939 c
 Eubulus rudis Fiedler, 1954 c
 Eubulus rugifrons Fiedler, 1939 c
 Eubulus sagittarius Fiedler, 1952 c
 Eubulus sellatus Fiedler, 1954 c
 Eubulus semifasciatus Fiedler, 1939 c
 Eubulus seminiger Champion, 1905 c
 Eubulus serius Champion, 1905 c
 Eubulus signaticollis Champion, 1905 c
 Eubulus signatifrons Champion, 1905 c
 Eubulus silaceus Fiedler, 1939 c
 Eubulus simplicifrons Fiedler, 1939 c
 Eubulus singularis Fiedler, 1954 c
 Eubulus sparsifrons Fiedler, 1939 c
 Eubulus sparsipes Fiedler, 1939 c
 Eubulus squamipennis Champion, 1905 c
 Eubulus stipator Hustache, 1936 c
 Eubulus stipulator Kirsch, 1869 c
 Eubulus stramineus Fiedler, 1939 c
 Eubulus subovalis Fiedler, 1939 c
 Eubulus subrhombeus Fiedler, 1952 c
 Eubulus tenuicornis Fiedler, 1954 c
 Eubulus tenuifasciatus Fiedler, 1939 c
 Eubulus tenuivittatus Fiedler, 1954 c
 Eubulus tessellatus Blatchley & Leng, 1916 c
 Eubulus tetricus Champion, 1905 c
 Eubulus theobromae Wibmer & O'Brien, 1986 c
 Eubulus thoracicus Hustache, 1930 c
 Eubulus tigrensis Hustache, 1939 c
 Eubulus triangularis Kirsch, 1869 c
 Eubulus trigonalis Champion, 1905 c
 Eubulus truncatellus Fiedler, 1954 c
 Eubulus truncatus Champion, 1905 c
 Eubulus unidentatus Champion, 1905 c
 Eubulus variegatus Fiedler, 1939 c
 Eubulus variicollis Fiedler, 1939 c
 Eubulus virgatulus Marshall, 1933 c

Data sources: i = ITIS, c = Catalogue of Life, g = GBIF, b = Bugguide.net

References

Eubulus
Articles created by Qbugbot